Hedong Sports Centre (Simplified Chinese: 河东体育中心) is a multi-use stadium in Tianjin, China.  It is currently used mostly for soccer matches. The stadium holds 12,000 people.

Footnotes

Sports venues in Tianjin
Football venues in Tianjin